The Page Valley is a small valley geographically and culturally associated with the Shenandoah Valley.  The valley is located between the Massanutten and Blue Ridge mountain ranges in western Virginia.

Geography

The valley encompasses primarily the Page County, Virginia area and the southern portion of Warren County, Virginia, near the northern terminus, a few miles south of Front Royal, Virginia.

The South Fork of the Shenandoah River flows along the western side of the Page Valley, along the eastern foot of the ridge-like Massanutten Mountain.

Transportation
U.S. Route 340 runs north-south through the valley, while U.S. Route 211 cuts east-west across the valley from Thornton Gap in the Blue Ridge, through Luray to New Market Gap in the Massanutten.

History
During the American Civil War, it was known as the Luray Valley since Luray, Virginia (the county seat of Page County) is located in the center of Page Valley.  The valley played a significant role in the strategy of Confederate Major General Thomas "Stonewall" Jackson during his Valley Campaign of 1862 in which he defeated three numerically superior Union armies.

External links
 

Valleys of Virginia
Landforms of Page County, Virginia
Landforms of Warren County, Virginia
Shenandoah River